Museums in Niue include: 

 Hikulagi Sculpture Park
 Tāoga Niue Museum, in the capital, Alofi, which replaced the Huanaki Cultural Centre & Museum, which was destroyed by Cyclone Heta in 2004.
 Tahiono Gallery

External links 

 Official Web Site : http://www.taoganiue.com/
 Tourism official web site : http://www.niueisland.com/art-culture/

Niue
Museums in Niue
Niue
Museums